, formally known as , is a Buddhist temple in Uemachi district of the city of Tottori, Tottori Prefecture, Japan. Kannon-in was built early in the Edo period (1603 – 1868) and is noted for its Edo-style Japanese garden.

History

Founding
Kannon-in built in the early Edo period and its history is closely related to that of the Ikeda clan. (1602 – 1632), daimyō of Okayama Domain in Bizen Province and lord of Okayama Castle, died at a young age and was succeeded by his 3 year old son  (1630 – 1693). The Tokugawa shogunate named the infant Mitsunaka daimyō of Tottori Domain in Hōki and Inaba provinces. In 1632, soon after Mitsunaka's accession to the position of daimyō, the fourth chief priest of Kōchin-ji in the present-day Okayama, sent his disciple Gōben to build a temple for the Ikeda clan. The temple was named Kannon-in. A statue of the Kannon Bodhisattva, reputably carved from rock from the mountain of Tottori Castle by the Gyōki (668 – 749), a Buddhist priest of the Nara period, was bestowed on the temple.

Move to Uemachi site
In 1639 the temple was moved to its present location in the Uemachi of present-day Tottori City to serve as a temple for the use of the Tottori Domain. Mitsunaka was deeply devoted to the Kannon Bodhisattva, and became a patron of the temple. At this time the extensive  temple complex Kannon-in was planned and built, including its well-known garden. At this time Kannon-in was formally renamed Fudarakusan Jigen-ji Kannon-in. Mitsunaka's oldest son, the second lord of the Tottori Domain, named Kannon-in a  prayer temple.

Later history
After the abolition of the han system Kannon-in ceased to be a temple under the patronage of the Ikeda clan, and the temple lost its rice stipend and any form of monetary support. Soon after local adherents of Kannon-in took over the financial support of the temple, support that continues to the present. The Kannon-in garden was designated as a Place of Scenic Beauty by the Japanese government in 1937.

Garden of Kannon-in 
The garden of Kannon-in was built is an example of an Edo period Japanese garden in the  style, which literally means a garden of the "pond appreciation style". A Chisenkanshō-shiki garden is meant to be viewed from a fixed perspective from a single location, rather than a garden to stroll through and view from several angles. Work on the garden began in 1650, and took ten years to complete. The garden utilizes the gentle slope of the landscape of Kannon-in. The Mudaaruki is probably based on earlier works. The  annex structure in the garden is in a slightly different location in the Mudaaruki than what is seen in the garden today, as the Kannon-in garden was probably restructured during the Meiji period.

Branch temples
Kannon-in has two branch temples.

, Tachikawachō, Tottori City
, Kokufuchō, Tottori City

Transportation 
8 minutes by taxi from Tottori Station, JR West Sanin Main Line

See also 
 For an explanation of terms used see the Glossary of Japanese Buddhism.

Order in Buddhist pilgrimage 
Kannon-in is the 32nd of the Chūgoku 33 Kannon Pilgrimage, a junrei pilgrimage route established in 1981 of 33 Buddhist temples in the dedicated to the Bodhisattva Kannon. The route stretches across the Chūgoku Region of western Japan from Okayama, Hiroshima, Yamaguchi, Shimane and Tottori prefectures.

See also
 List of Places of Scenic Beauty of Japan (Tottori)

References

External links
補陀落山 慈眼寺 観音院
Tottori City Sightseeing: Kannon-in Garden

17th-century Buddhist temples
Buddhist temples in Tottori Prefecture
Parks and gardens in Tottori Prefecture
1632 establishments in Japan
Tendai temples
Tottori (city)
Places of Scenic Beauty